Thaumasia is a genus of nursery web spiders that was first described by Josef Anton Maximilian Perty in 1833.

Species
 it contains seventeen species, found in South America, Costa Rica, Panama, Honduras, and Mexico:
Thaumasia abrahami Mello-Leitão, 1948 – Honduras to Brazil
Thaumasia acreana Silva & Carico, 2012 – Brazil
Thaumasia annulipes F. O. Pickard-Cambridge, 1903 – Suriname, Peru, Brazil
Thaumasia argenteonotata (Simon, 1898) – Mexico to Brazil
Thaumasia caracarai Silva & Carico, 2012 – Mexico to Brazil
Thaumasia caxiuana Silva & Carico, 2012 – Brazil
Thaumasia diasi Silva & Carico, 2012 – Ecuador, Brazil
Thaumasia heterogyna Chamberlin & Ivie, 1936 – Panama to Brazil
Thaumasia hirsutochela Silva & Carico, 2012 – Costa Rica to Brazil
Thaumasia lisei Silva & Carico, 2012 – Brazil
Thaumasia onca Silva & Carico, 2012 – Colombia to Brazil
Thaumasia oriximina Silva & Carico, 2012 – Brazil
Thaumasia peruana Silva & Carico, 2012 – Peru
Thaumasia scoparia (Simon, 1888) – Venezuela
Thaumasia senilis Perty, 1833 (type) – Costa Rica to Paraguay
Thaumasia velox Simon, 1898 – Panama to Argentina
Thaumasia xingu Silva & Carico, 2012 – Colombia to Brazil

See also
 List of Pisauridae species

References

Araneomorphae genera
Pisauridae
Spiders of Central America
Spiders of Mexico
Spiders of South America